Laboratory funnels are funnels that have been made for use in the chemical laboratory. There are many different kinds of funnels that have been adapted for these specialized applications. Filter funnels, thistle funnels (shaped like thistle flowers), and dropping funnels have stopcocks which allow the fluids to be added to a flask slowly. For solids, a powder funnel with a short and wide neck/stem is more appropriate as it prevents clogging.

When used with filter paper, filter funnels, Buchner and Hirsch funnels can be used to remove fine particles from a liquid in a process called filtration. For more demanding applications, the filter paper in the latter two may be replaced with a sintered glass frit.

Separatory funnels are used in liquid-liquid extractions.

Manufacturing 

Borosilicate glass is one of the most common materials of choice for laboratory applications due to its inertness compared with metals or plastics. However, plastic funnels made of non-reactive polyethylene are used for transferring aqueous solutions. Plastic is most often used for powder funnels which do not come into contact with solvents in normal use.

The types of funnels in the laboratory

 Plain funnels exist in various dimensions, with longer or shorter necks.
 Filter funnels have a neck of a thin capillary tube and ribs which increase the filter-papers' effectiveness and thus accelerate the process of filtering.
 Powder funnels have a short and wide neck for fast pouring of powders.
 Separatory funnels are pear-shaped, have a cap and a short neck, with a stopcock for the even pouring of fluids. These are used to decant two immiscible fluids. It can be graduated, though this is not very common. 
 Hirsch funnels are shaped much like normal funnels, but contain holes or sintered glass at the base for quick filtrations.
 Dropping funnels are a cylindrical, regularly graduated funnel with standard taper ground glass joints. These are often supplied with a pressure equalizer.
 Buchner funnels are  made of porcelain and include a plate of sintered glass or perforated porcelain. These are used in filtration under low pressure with a Buchner flask.
 Hot filtration funnel is a less commonly seen funnel where the funnel is jacketed, and surrounded by a heated fluid.
 Eco funnel is equipped with a latching lid and gasket to reduce chemical contamination and conform to OSHA and EPA regulations.

References 

Laboratory glassware